Cedric Coleman, professionally known by his stage name Frayser Boy, is an American rapper from Memphis, Tennessee. He was formerly signed to Hypnotize Minds, the record label run by Three 6 Mafia founders DJ Paul and Juicy J, and had released three studio albums under the label: Gone on That Bay (2003), Me Being Me (2005), and Da Key (2008). At the 78th Academy Awards, he won the Academy Award for Best Original Song for "It's Hard out Here for a Pimp" along with Three 6 Mafia members Juicy J, Crunchy Black, and DJ Paul.

In 2014, Coleman released B.A.R. (Bay Area Representatives), a ten years in the making collaborative project with fellow rapper Lil Wyte, and his fourth solo studio album titled Not No Moe, both through Phixieous Entertainment. Same year, he was featured in the documentary film Take Me to the River alone with Terrence Howard, Snoop Dogg, Yo Gotti and Al Kapone among others. In 2018, he starred in Muck Sticky-directed drama film Dig That, Zeebo Newton. He is currently working on his fifth solo effort, Gone on That Bay 2, a sequel to his debut full-length.

Discography

References

External links
Frayser Boy at Discogs

1982 births
Living people
African-American crunk musicians
African-American male rappers
Asylum Records artists
Best Original Song Academy Award-winning songwriters
Gangsta rappers
Rappers from Memphis, Tennessee
Southern hip hop musicians
Underground rappers
21st-century American rappers
21st-century American male musicians
21st-century African-American musicians
20th-century African-American people